The Spindles may refer to:

 The Spindles Town Square Shopping Centre, a retail complex in Oldham, England
 The Spindles, burial towers at Amrit, Syria

See also
Spindle (disambiguation)